Step by Step is a 1946 American drama film directed by Phil Rosen, written by Stuart Palmer, and starring Lawrence Tierney, Anne Jeffreys, Lowell Gilmore, Myrna Dell, Harry Harvey, Sr. and Addison Richards. It was released on August 30, 1946, by RKO Pictures.

Plot

A secretary, Evelyn Smith, lands a job working for Remmy, a Senator. One day while swimming, she encounters Johnny Christopher, a passerby who stopped to admire her. Johnny just returned from active duty in the Pacific during WWII. He and his war dog, Bazuka, flirt with Evelyn who smiles and then returns to Remmy's home.

Johnny locks himself out of his car, so on foot (and in his bathing suit) he makes his way to Remmy's nearby home. A strange woman answers the door and claims to be Evelyn, confusing Johnny. The more he snoops around, the more he is convinced that something is wrong, but the police refuse to believe him.

Johnny sneaks back into Remmy's home, donning clothes he finds laying around. Enemy agents have tied up Remmy, the real Evelyn and the senator's chauffeur. They are searching for a list in the Senator's possession, but Johnny accidentally ends up with possession of it due to his new wardrobe. The chauffeur is shot, the Senator is unconscious and a government operative, James Blackton is dead. The chauffeur escapes and brings in the police and the coroner.  The Senator comes around and the police are sure it is an inside job, with Evelyn and Johnny as the prime suspects.

Fleeing for their lives, Evelyn and Johnny end up at a motel run by Capt. Caleb Simpson and gain his trust. Unbeknownst to them, the enemy agents are also staying at the motel. Evelyn and Johnny track down the chauffeur and try to get information about the list from him. The chauffeur is about to spill the beans when the enemy agents shoot him through the open window. The enemy agents make a quick get-away, and Capt. Simpson helps Evelyn and Johnny escape from the police.

The enemy agents connect Johnny, Bazuka and the borrowed clothes. The spies decide the list must be in the jacket and then discover Evelyn and Johnny's hiding place at the motel. Johnny tells them he disposed of the jacket in the sea. The enemy agents knock out Johnny and Evelyn. After finding the jacket in the back of Johnny's car, and the list in the jacket pocket, the enemy agents plan to dispose of Evelyn and Johnny. They drive off with Johnny in the trunk and Evelyn wrapped up in the back seat. The police arrive and search the motel. They find a letter Johnny was writing to the Senator. After getting stopped at a police barricade, they are recognized and escape after shooting a police officer.  Johnny tries to signal with the tail lights in Morse code.

The enemy agents plan to scuttle a boat with Evelyn and Johnny aboard.  While in the boathouse, Johnny breaks loose and fights with the two male enemy agents and Evelyn takes care of the female agent. Capt. Caleb arrives with the police to place the enemy agents under arrest.

Evelyn and Johnny marry with Bazuka and Capt. Caleb in tow.

Cast 

Lawrence Tierney as Johnny Christopher
Anne Jeffreys as Evelyn Smith
Lowell Gilmore as Von Dorn
Myrna Dell as Gretchen
Harry Harvey, Sr. as Senator Remmy	
Addison Richards as James Blackton 
Ray Walker as Agent Jorgensen
Jason Robards, Sr.	as Bruckner 
George Cleveland as Captain Caleb Simpson

References

External links 
 

1946 films
American black-and-white films
RKO Pictures films
Films directed by Phil Rosen
1946 drama films
American drama films
Films scored by Paul Sawtell
1940s English-language films
1940s American films